This is a list of the extreme points of Chile.

Latitude and longitude 
Geographic coordinates expressed in WGS 84.

Chile 
 Northernmost point: Tripartite border with Bolivia and Peru in Arica and Parinacota Region near Visviri
 Southernmost point can be either:
 Águila Islet, Diego Ramírez Islands in Magallanes and Antártica Chilena Region , or, if Antarctic Chilean Territory claims are considered,
 The South Pole in Magallanes and Antártica Chilena Region
 Westernmost point: Motu Nui, off Easter Island
 Easternmost point can be either:
 Nueva Island in Magallanes and Antártica Chilena Region, or, if Antarctic Chilean Territory claims are considered,
 The 53rd meridian west of Greenwich, over Antarctica in Magallanes and Antártica Chilena Region.

Mainland 
 Northernmost point: Tripartite border with Bolivia and Peru in Arica and Parinacota Region
 Southernmost point: Cape Froward in Magallanes and Antártica Chilena Region
 Westernmost point: Taitao Peninsula in Aisén Region
 Easternmost point: Off Nevados de Poquis in Antofagasta Region

Geographical center 
Chile (Including Easter Island):
including Antarctic territorial claims: South Pacific Ocean, 687 km WbS of Punta Arenas, Magallanes and Antártica Chilena Region, Chile
excluding Antarctic territorial claims: South Pacific Ocean, 737 km SWbW of Alejandro Selkirk Island, Valparaíso Region, Chile
Mainland: about 8 km. east of Colbún, Maule Region, Chile

Altitude 
Height referred to mean sea level.
 Highest point: Ojos del Salado in Atacama Region, 6,893 m
 Lowest point: Pacific Ocean, 0 m

Monuments
There is a monument at Playa Blanca ("White Beach"), located between Coronel and Lota in the Biobío Region, representing the middle of continental Chile north-south.

South of Punta Arenas there is another such monument, marking Chile's north-south center, including Antarctic territorial claims (photo).

References

Extreme Points
Chile
Geography of Chile